Women's History Month is an annual declared month that highlights the contributions of women to events in history and contemporary society. It is celebrated during March in the United States, the United Kingdom, and Australia, corresponding with International Women's Day on March 8, and during October in Canada, corresponding with the celebration of Persons Day on October 18.

The commemoration began in 1978 as "Women's History day" in Sonoma County, California, and was championed by Gerda Lerner and the National Women's History Alliance to be recognized as a national week (1980) and then month (1987) in the United States, spreading internationally after that.

History

In the United States

Women's History Week 
In the United States, Women's History Month traces its beginnings back to the first International Women's Day in 1911. The holiday had been largely forgotten in the US until the late 1960s, when an activist calling herself Laura X organized a march in Berkeley, CA, on International Women’s Day (March 8, 1969). The march led to the U.S. rediscovery of International Women’s Day, and the creation of The Women’s History Research Center, a central archive of the Women’s movement from 1968 to 1974.  Laura X thought it unfair for half the human race to have only one day a year and called for National Women’s History Month to be built around International Women’s Day.  The Women’s History Research Center collected nearly one million documents on microfilm, and provided resources and records of the Women’s liberation movement that are now available through the National Women’s History Alliance, which carried on their ideas, including successfully petitioning Congress to declare March as Women’s History Month.  In 1978, the school district of Sonoma, California participated in Women's History Week, an event designed around the week of March 8 (International Women's Day). In 1979, a fifteen-day conference about women's history was held at Sarah Lawrence College from July 13 until July 29, chaired by historian Gerda Lerner. It was co-sponsored by Sarah Lawrence College, the Women's Action Alliance, and the Smithsonian Institution. When its participants learned about the success of the Sonoma County's Women's History Week celebration, they decided to initiate similar celebrations within their own organizations, communities, and school districts. They also agreed to support an effort to secure a National Women's History Week.

In February 1980, President Jimmy Carter issued a presidential proclamation declaring the week of March 8, 1980, as National Women's History Week. The proclamation stated, "From the first settlers who came to our shores, from the first American Indian families who befriended them, men and women have worked together to build this nation. Too often the women were unsung and sometimes their contributions went unnoticed. But the achievements, leadership, courage, strength and love of the women who built America was as vital as that of the men whose names we know so well. As Dr. Gerda Lerner has noted, 'Women’s History is Women’s Right.' It is an essential and indispensable heritage from which we can draw pride, comfort, courage, and long-range vision. I ask my fellow Americans to recognize this heritage with appropriate activities during National Women’s History Week, March 2–8, 1980. I urge libraries, schools, and community organizations to focus their observances on the leaders who struggled for equality –Susan B. Anthony, Sojourner Truth, Lucy Stone, Lucretia Mott, Elizabeth Cady Stanton, Harriet Tubman, and Alice Paul. Understanding the true history of our country will help us to comprehend the need for full equality under the law for all our people. This goal can be achieved by ratifying the 27th Amendment to the United States Constitution, which states that 'Equality of Rights under the Law shall not be denied or abridged by the United States or by any state on account of sex.'" Carter was referring to the Equal Rights Amendment, which was never ratified, not to the amendment which did become the 27th Amendment to the United States Constitution after his presidency.

In 1981, responding to the growing popularity of Women's History Week, Sen. Orrin Hatch (R-Utah) and Rep Barbara Mikulski (D-Maryland) co-sponsored the first Joint Congressional Resolution proclaiming a Women's History Week. Congress passed their resolution as Pub. L. 97-28, which authorized and requested the President to proclaim the week beginning March 7, 1982 as “Women’s History Week." Throughout the next several years, Congress continued to pass joint resolutions designating a week in March as Women's History Week. Schools across the country also began to have their own local celebrations of Women's History Week and even Women's History Month. By 1986, fourteen states had declared March as Women's History Month.

Women's History Month 
In 1987, after being petitioned by the National Women's History Project, Congress passed Pub. L. 100-9 which designated the month of March 1987 as Women's History Month. Between 1988 and 1994, Congress passed additional resolutions requesting and authorizing the President to proclaim March of each year as Women's History Month. Since 1988, U.S. presidents have issued annual proclamations designating the month of March as Women's History Month on occasion.

State departments of education also began to encourage celebrations of Women's History Month as a way to promote equality among the sexes in the classroom. Maryland, Pennsylvania, Alaska, New York, Oregon, and other states developed and distributed curriculum materials in all of their public schools, which prompted educational events such as essay contests. Within a few years, thousands of schools and communities began to celebrate of Women's History Month.  They planned engaging and stimulating programs about women's roles in history and society, with support and encouragement from governors, city councils, school boards, and the U.S. Congress.

In March 2011, the Obama administration released a report, Women in America: Indicators of Social and Economic Well-Being, showing women's status in the U.S. in 2011 and how it had changed over time. This report was the first comprehensive federal report on women since the report produced by the Commission on the Status of Women in 1963.

Some organizations have issued statements marking Women's History Month, for example the Republican National Committee and the Democratic National Committee.

A President's Commission on the Celebration of Women in History in America recently sponsored hearings in many parts of the country. The Women's Progress Commission will soon conduct hearings to promote interest in preserving areas that are relevant in American women's history. Some of the groups promoting this interest are state historical societies, women's organizations, and groups such as the Girl Scouts of the USA.

Presidential Proclamations of Women’s History Week
1980 (scroll down) 
1982 
1983 
1984 
1985 
1986

Presidential Proclamations of Women's History Month

1988 
1989 and 1990 
1991 
1992 
1993 
1994 
1995 
1996 
1997 
1998 
1999 
2000 
2001 
2002 
2003 
2004 
2005 
2006 
2007 
2008 
2009 
2010 
2011 
2012 
2013 
2014 
2015 
2016 
2017 
2018 
2019 
2020 
2021 
2022

Annual themes of Women's History Month, declared by the National Women's History Project
1987: "Generations of Courage, Compassion, and Conviction"
1988: "Reclaiming the Past, Rewriting the Future"
1989: "Heritage of Strength and Vision"
1990: "Courageous Voices – Echoing in Our Lives" TWomens have to be equal
1991: "Nurturing Tradition, Fostering Change"
1992: "A Patchwork of Many Lives"
1993: "Discover a New World"
1994: "In Every Generation, Action Frees Our Dreams"
1995: "Promises to Keep"
1996: "See History in a New Way"
1997: "A Fine and Long Tradition of Community Leadership"
1998: "Living the Legacy"
1999: "Women Putting Our Stamp on America"
2000: "An Extraordinary Century for Women 1900–2000"
2001: "Celebrating Women of Courage and Vision"
2002: "Women Sustaining the American Spirit"
2003: "Women Pioneering the Future"
2004: "Women Inspiring Hope and Possibility"
2005: "Women Change America"
2006: "Women, Builders of Communities and Dreams"
2007: "Generations of Women Moving History Forward"
2008: "Women's Art Women's Vision"
2009: "Women Taking the Lead to Save Our Planet"
2010: "Writing Women Back into History"
2011: "Our History is Our Strength"
2012: "Women's Education – Women's Empowerment"
2013: "Women Inspiring Innovation Through Imagination:Celebrating Women in Science, Technology, Engineering and Mathematics"
2014: "Celebrating Women of Character, Courage, and Commitment"
2015: "Weaving the Stories of Women’s Lives"
2016: "Working to Form a More Perfect Union: Honoring Women in Public Service and Government"
2017: "Honoring Trailblazing Women in Labor and Business"
2018: "Nevertheless, She Persisted: Honoring Women Who Fight All Forms of Discrimination against Women", referring to Mitch McConnell's "Nevertheless, she persisted" remark about Elizabeth Warren.
2019: "Visionary Women: Champions of Peace & Nonviolence"Home
2020: "Valiant Women of the Vote", marking the Women's Suffrage Centennial
2021: "Valiant Women of the Vote: Refusing to Be Silenced", continuing previous year's theme due to the COVID-19 pandemic
2022: "Women Providing Healing, Promoting Hope"
2023: "Celebrating Women Who Tell Our Stories"

In Canada
Women's History Month was proclaimed in Canada in 1992, where its purpose is to give Canadians "an opportunity to learn about the important contributions of women and girls to our society – and to the quality of our lives today". October was chosen to coincide with the celebration of the anniversary on October 18 of the decision of the court case Edwards v. Canada, more commonly known as the Persons Case, in which it was established that Canadian women were eligible to be appointed senators and in general had the same rights as Canadian men with respect to positions of political power.

In Russia
Since 2017, there is a group of female volunteers (Women's Museum in Moscow) who spend a virtual month of women's history in Russian. Facebook Groups

In Ukraine
The Gender Museum  in Kharkiv hosts events in honor of Women's History Month in Ukrainian.

In Australia
Women's History Month was first celebrated in Australia in 2000, initiated by Helen Leonard, convenor of the National Women's Media Centre, working with the Women's Electoral Lobby. The organisation of annual Women's History Month celebrations is incorporated as part of the work of the Australian Women's History Forum.

Annual themes
Since 2005, the annual celebration of Women's History Month in Australia has centred on a different area of women's achievement. Promotional materials and events are focused around the theme and organisations, institutions and community groups are encouraged to use this theme for their own events. AWHF hosted Women’s "History Month Finale: The Great Debate 2014", marking the end of its official commemorations.

 2013: Finding Founding Mothers
 2012: Women with a Plan: architects, town planners and landscape architects
 2011: Women in the Business of Food
 2009: Parliamentary Women
 2008: Women with a Mission: Australian women contributing overseas
 2007: Arm in Arm: Indigenous and non-Indigenous Women Working Together
 2006: Musical Belles: Women in Music
 2005: Celebrating Racy Women

In Hungary 
The archaeologists of the Szent István Király Museum (Székesfehérvár) made several Facebook posts in honor of Women's History Month in 2021, the first time in Hungary. Also this year, in the Hungarian National Museum there was an exhibition with a title of "Women in Art" in March.

References

External links

 Women's History Month in the United States
 Women's History Month in Canada
 Australian Women's History Forum incorporating Women's History Month
 Archive of past Women's History Month websites in Australia from the Pandora Archive

Commemorative months
March observances
Women in history
Women's history
American Association of University Women